The City of Lake Macquarie is a local government area in Greater Newcastle and part of the Hunter Region in New South Wales, Australia. It was proclaimed a city from 7 September 1984. The area is situated adjacent to the city of Newcastle and is part of the Greater Newcastle Area. One of its major tourist attractions is its lake, also named Lake Macquarie.

The mayor of the City of Lake Macquarie Council is Councillor Kay Fraser, a member of the Labor Party.

The Royal Australian Navy ship  was granted the Right of Freedom of Entry to the City of Lake Macquarie on 9 August 1991.

History
The Shire of Lake Macquarie was proclaimed on 6 March 1906. It became a Municipality on 1 March 1977, and a city on 7 September 1984.

Main towns and villages
Lake Macquarie is home to several prominent coastal suburbs such as Catherine Hill Bay, Caves Beach, Blacksmiths Beach and Redhead. Retail centres include Belmont, Cardiff, Charlestown, Glendale, Swansea, Toronto, and Morisset with its large area and rapidly increasing developments.

Significant population centres include:
 Belmont
 Cardiff
 Charlestown
 Cooranbong
 Glendale
 Morisset
 Mount Hutton
 Swansea
 Toronto
 Valentine
 Warners Bay

The Australian Bureau of Statistics classifies various towns and suburbs in the LGA as being part of the Newcastle Statistical District. The City of Lake Macquarie has its own independent local government (Lake Macquarie City Council). The largest commercial centre in the region is Charlestown.

Demographics

The area is a set of contiguous towns that surround a coastal saltwater lake. These towns merge with the suburbs of Newcastle to the north. Some suburbs, such as Adamstown Heights are partly in the City of Newcastle and partly within the City of Lake Macquarie. There are 92 identified settlements ranging from small rural style communities through to larger and higher density areas such as Toronto, Warners Bay, Belmont, Charlestown and Morisset.

Aboriginal and Torres Strait Islander people made up 3.0% of the population, which was higher than the national and state averages. The median age of people in the City of Lake Macquarie was 41 years, which was significantly higher than the national median of 37 years. Children aged 0 – 14 years made up 18.6% of the population and people aged 65 years and over made up 18.4% of the population. Of people in the area aged 15 years and over, 51.0% were married and 12.2% were either divorced or separated.

When compared with total population growth of Australia for the same periods, being 5.78% and 8.32% respectively, population growth in Lake Macquarie local government area was approximately half the national average. The median weekly income for residents within the City of Lake Macquarie was marginally below the national average.

At the 2011 Census, the proportion of residents in the Lake Macquarie local government area who stated their ancestry as Australian or Anglo-Celtic exceeded 81% of all residents (national average was 65.2%). In excess of 58% of all residents in the City of Lake Macquarie nominated a religious affiliation with Christianity at the 2011 census, which was slightly higher than the national average of 50.2%. Meanwhile, as at the census date, compared to the national average, households in the Lake Macquarie local government area had a significantly lower than average proportion (5.4%) where two or more languages are spoken (national average was 20.4%); and a significantly higher proportion (93.0%) where English only was spoken at home (national average was 76.8%).

Economics
Lake Macquarie has a significant coal mining industry and smaller agriculture and manufacturing industries. Eraring power station, a 1980s-era coal-fired power station, supplies 25% of New South Wales' power. Lake Macquarie has a number of Constructed Wetlands with the council placing an emphasis on the environment.

Council

Current composition and election method
Lake Macquarie City Council is composed of thirteen Councillors, including the mayor, for a fixed four-year term of office. The mayor is directly elected while the twelve other Councillors are elected proportionally as three separate wards, each electing four Councillors. The most recent election was held on 04 December 2021, and the makeup of the council, including the mayor, is as follows:

The current Council, elected in 2021, in order of election by ward, is:

Shopping
Major shopping centres include:
 Charlestown Square
 Stockland Glendale
 Lake Macquarie Square

Arts and culture
Lake Macquarie has a number of cultural and artistic locations:
 Dobell House - last residence of William Dobell, Wangi Wangi
 Finite Gallery, Caves Beach Fine Arts and Crafts
 Lake Macquarie City Art Gallery, Booragul
 South Sea Islands Museum and Sunnyside Historic Home, Cooranbong
 The Friends of Rathmines Incorporated, Rathmines Park

Sister cities
The City of Lake Macquarie has sister city relations with the following cities:
 Hakodate, Hokkaidō, Japan
 Tanagura, Fukushima, Japan
 Rotorua, Bay of Plenty, New Zealand
 Round Rock, Texas, United States of America

References

External links

 Lake Macquarie City Council
 Lake Macquarie Business Directory
 Lake Macquarie City
 Clickable map of New South Wales LGAs (NSW Dept. of Local Government)
 Rathmines Community Website and Forum
 

 
Coastal cities in Australia